The classification of the Tunisian Ligue Professionnelle 1 table all seasons combined is a classification which aims to determine which team in the history of the Tunisian football championship has had the most success, not by the number of titles but by the number of points.

This ranking combines all the points and goals of each team that has played in the Tunisian championship since independence in 1956 until the end of the 2019–20 season.

General classification

References 

Tunisian Ligue Professionnelle 1
Football in Tunisia